The 1922–23 Yorkshire Cup was the fifteen occasion on which the  Yorkshire Cup competition had been held. For the third year in succession, the  name of yet another new club appeared on the  trophy. This year, York won the trophy by beating Batley by the score of 5–0 in the final. The match was played at Headingley, Leeds, now in West Yorkshire. The attendance was 33,719 and receipts were £2,414.

Background 

The Rugby Football League's Yorkshire Cup competition was a knock-out competition between (mainly professional) rugby league clubs from  the  county of Yorkshire. The actual area was at times increased to encompass other teams from  outside the  county such as Newcastle, Mansfield, Coventry, and even London (in the form of Acton & Willesden). The Rugby League season always (until the onset of "Summer Rugby" in 1996) ran from around August-time through to around May-time and this competition always took place early in the season, in the Autumn, with the final taking place in (or just before) December (The only exception to this was when disruption of the fixture list was caused during, and immediately after, the two World Wars).

Competition and results  
This season, two junior clubs were invited to enter bringing the total number taking part up to a "full house" of sixteen, which in turn removed the  necessity to have any byes.

Round 1 
Involved  8 matches (with no byes) and 16 clubs

Round 2 – quarterfinals 
Involved 4 matches and 8 clubs

Round 3 – semifinals  
Involved 2 matches and 4 clubs

Final

Teams and scorers 

Scoring - Try = three (3) points - Goal = two (2) points - Drop goal = two (2) points

The road to success

See also 
1922–23 Northern Rugby Football League season
Rugby league county cups

Notes 
1 * Sharlston Rovers are a junior (or amateur) club from Wakefield 

2 * Sharlston Rovers forgo ground advantage for a better ground/higher receipts

3 * The first Yorkshire Cup match to be played at the new stadium

4 * Elland Wanderers were a Junior/amateur club from Elland (Halifax)

5 * cannot locate any reference to this fixture, but both Wakefield Trinity and Dewsbury won their first round tie and Wakefield Trinity proceed to the  semi-final. The venue and score are both unknown

6 * The attendance was at the  time, a record, and this for, arguably, possibly two of the  least glamorous teams in the  competition. The record was not to be bettered until 1949, and then only the once.

7 * The  receipts of £2,414 were also a record and this would stand for almost 25 years until broken in 1946 with a new record of £3,718

8 * Headingley, Leeds, now in West Yorkshire

References

External links
Saints Heritage Society
1896–97 Northern Rugby Football Union season at wigan.rlfans.com
Hull&Proud Fixtures & Results 1896/1897
Widnes Vikings - One team, one passion Season In Review - 1896-97
The Northern Union at warringtonwolves.org

RFL Yorkshire Cup
Yorkshire Cup